The fringed tree frog (Ranoidea eucnemis) is a species of frog in the subfamily Pelodryadinae. It is found in Australia and New Guinea. Its natural habitats are subtropical or tropical moist lowland forests, subtropical or tropical moist montane forests, rivers, intermittent rivers, rural gardens, and heavily degraded former forest.

It is threatened by habitat loss.

References
 

Ranoidea (genus)
Amphibians of Queensland
Amphibians of Papua New Guinea
Amphibians of Western New Guinea
Amphibians described in 1900
Taxonomy articles created by Polbot
Taxa named by Einar Lönnberg
Taxobox binomials not recognized by IUCN